17621 / 22 Aurangabad–Rainguta junction  Express is an Express train belonging to Indian Railways South Central Railway zone that run between  and  in India.

Service 
It operates as train number 17621 from Aurangabad to Renigunta Junction and as train number 17622 in the reverse direction, serving the states of Maharashtra, Karnataka, Telangana & Andhra Pradesh.

Schedule

Coaches

The 17621 / 22 Aurangabad–Renigunta Junction Express has one AC 3-tier, six sleeper class, six general unreserved & two SLR (seating with luggage rake) coaches. It doesn't carries a pantry car.

As with most train services in India, coach composition may be amended at the discretion of Indian Railways depending on demand.

Routeing

Traction
As this route is partially electrified, a Guntakal-based electric WDM-3A pulls the train up to  then a Arakkonam-based diesel WAP-4 loco pulls the train to its destination.

References

External links
17621 Aurangabad Renigunta Junction Express at India Rail Info
17622 Renigunta Junction Aurangabad Express at India Rail Info

Transport in Aurangabad, Maharashtra
Transport in Tirupati
Express trains in India
Rail transport in Karnataka
Rail transport in Andhra Pradesh
Rail transport in Telangana
Rail transport in Maharashtra